Wilson Hall may refer to:

 Wilson Hall (rugby league), New Zealand rugby league footballer of the 1920s and 1930s
 Wilson Hall (Bucksport, Maine), a historic Methodist seminary building
 Wilson Hall (Arkansas Tech University), Russellville, Arkansas, U.S.
 Wilson Hall (Miami University), Oxford, Ohio, U.S.
 Wilson Hall, University of Melbourne, Australia
 Wilson Hall, at Fermilab
Wilson Hall, a member of music group God's Pottery

See also 
 Woodrow Wilson Hall, James Madison University
 Woodrow Wilson Hall, or Shadow Lawn, at Monmouth University, West Long Branch, New Jersey
 Wilson House (disambiguation)

Hall, Wilson
Architectural disambiguation pages